The 41st Bombardment Squadron is an inactive United States Air Force unit.  Its last assignment was with the 448th Bombardment Group, based at Long Beach Municipal Airport, California.  It was inactivated on 27 June 1949.

Heraldry
Emblem: On a disc, orange in base, shaded up to sky blue, within an ultra¬marine blue border, a large, gray elephant with white tusks, running toward dexter, and holding aloft in the trunk a very large, red aerial bomb, in front of white, cirrus cloud formations, edged light turquoise blue, and marked red violet on under side, all leaving white vapor trails to rear. (Approved 17 April 1945).

History
Activated 1 April 1944 at Dalhart Army Airfield, Texas.  Initially equipped with B-17 Flying Fortresses for training, due to shortage of B-29 Superfortresses.    Moved to Harvard Army Airfield, Nebraska, in August 1944 and equipped with B-29B limited production aircraft.

After completion of training deployed to Central Pacific Area (CPA), assigned to XXI Bomber Command, Northwest Field (Guam) for operational missions.  B-29Bs were standard production aircraft stripped of most defensive guns to increase speed and bomb load, The tail gun was aimed and fired automatically by the new AN/APG-15B radar fire control system that detected the approaching enemy plane and made all the necessary calculations.

Mission of the squadron was the strategic bombardment of the Japanese Home Islands.  Entered combat on 16 June 1945 with a bombing raid against an airfield on Moen. Flew first mission against the Japanese home islands on 26 June 1945 and afterwards operated principally against the enemy's petroleum industry.  Flew primarily low-level, fast attacks at night using a mixture of high-explosive and incendiary bombs to attack targets.

Flew last combat mission on 15 August 1945, later flew in "Show of Force" mission on 2 September 1945 over Tokyo Bay during formal Japanese Surrender. Inactivated on Guam 15 April 1946, personnel returned to the United States and aircraft sent to storage in Southwest United States.

Allocated to the Air Force Reserve as a Tactical Air Command B-26 Invader light bomb group in 1947.  Inactivated in 1949 due to budget restrictions.

On 19 September 1985 the 41st Bombardment Squadron, (Very Heavy) was consolidated with the 41st Air Refueling Squadron, Heavy, a unit that is(as of 19 September 1985) active, however the unit was inactivated on 15 February 1993. This action was directed by Department of the Air Force Letter "DAF/MPM 662q Attachment 1 (Active Units), 19 Sep 1985. The Consolidated Unit will retain the Designation of 41st Air Refueling Squadron, Heavy".

Operations and decorations
 Combat Operations: Combat in Western Pacific, 23 Jun-14 Aug 1945.
 Campaigns: Air Offensive; Japan; Eastern Mandates; Western Pacific.
 Decorations: Distinguished Unit Citation, Japan 6–13 Jul 1945

Lineage
 Constituted 41st Bombardment Squadron (Very Heavy) on 28 March 1944
 Activated on 1 April 1944
 Inactivated on 10 May 1944
 Activated on 1 June 1944
 Inactivated on 10 June 1946
 Activated in the reserve on 12 July 1947
 Inactivated on 27 June 1949.

Assignments
 6th Bombardment Group, 1 April-10 May 1944
 501st Bombardment Group, 1 June 1944 – 10 June 1946
 448th Bombardment Group, 12 July 1947 – 27 June 1949.

Stations
 Dalhart Army Air Field, Texas, 1 April–10 May 1944; 1 June 1944
 Harvard Army Airfield, Nebraska, 23 August 1944 – 7 March 1945
 Northwest Field, Guam, 14 April 1945 – 10 June 1946
 Long Beach Municipal Aprt, California, 12 July 1947 – 27 June 1949.

Aircraft
 B-29 Superfortress, 1944–1946
 Douglas B-26 Invader, 1947–1949

References

 Maurer, Maurer (1983). Air Force Combat Units of World War II. Maxwell AFB, Alabama: Office of Air Force History. .

Military units and formations established in 1944
041
041